Fox Film Corp. v. Knowles, 261 U.S. 326 (1923), was a United States Supreme Court case in which the Court held the statute intends that an executor, there being no widow, widower, or child, shall have the same right to renew a copyright for a second term as his testator might have exercised had he continued to survive.

This case was reaffirmed in Miller Music Corp. v. Charles N. Daniels, Inc..

References

External links
 

1923 in United States case law
United States copyright case law
United States Supreme Court cases
United States Supreme Court cases of the Taft Court